Sai Nath University is a private university located in Ranchi, Jharkhand, India. Sai Nath University is approved by PCI , BCI , NCTE, AICTE and State Nursing Council. The University is established with the aims to uplift the level of human resource in order to synchronise with ever changing corporate world. And Secondly to impart the higher education in India especially in the state of Jharkhand at cost-effective quality education where the students can also benefited with various scholarship schemes of the state and central government.

Academics 
Sai Nath University offers degree programs in all major disciplines including undergraduate and postgraduate education. Sai Nath University has the following academic departments:

Faculty of Science & Technology
Faculty of Medical Science & Research
Faculty of Nursing 
Faculty of Agriculture
Faculty of Education & Physical Education
Faculty of Law & Research
Faculty of Pharmacy

See also
Education in India
List of private universities in India
List of institutions of higher education in Jharkhand

References

External links

Universities in Jharkhand
Universities and colleges in Ranchi
2013 establishments in Jharkhand
Educational institutions established in 2013